Upendo Ni Pamoja is an album by the pianist Ramsey Lewis, recorded in 1972. It was his first release for the Columbia label, after a decade with Chess Records in Chicago.

Reception

AllMusic stated: "The problem with this is that few tracks stay with the listener. This is a cut or two away from being truly essential".

Track listing
All compositions by Ramsey Lewis except as indicated
 "Slipping into Darkness" (Papa Dee Allen, Harold Brown, B.B. Dickerson, Lonnie Jordan, Charles Miller, Lee Oskar, Howard E. Scott) - 6:15
 "People Make the World Go Round" (Thom Bell, Linda Creed) - 4:51
 "Please Send Me Someone to Love" (Percy Mayfield) - 4:33   
 "Got to Be There" (Elliot Willensky) - 3:03   
 "Concierto de Aranjuez" (Joaquín Rodrigo) - 8:55   
 "Upendo Ni Pamoja (Love Is Together)" (Eddie Green) - 7:22   
 "Trilogy: Morning/The Nite Before/Eteral Peace" (Cleveland Eaton) - 8:46   
 "Put Your Hand in the Hand" (Gene MacLellan) - 3:52   
 "Collage" (Eddie Green) - 6:32

Personnel 
Ramsey Lewis - piano, electric piano
Cleveland Eaton - bass, electric bass
Morris Jennings  - drums, percussion

References 

1972 albums
Ramsey Lewis albums
Columbia Records albums